Jerônimo Dix-Sept Rosado Maia (Mossoró, 1911 — Aracaju, 12 de julho de 1951) was a Brazilian politician, mayor of Mossoró and governor of Rio Grande do Norte state in Brazil.

Early years 

Born March 25, 1911, in Mossoró, Jerônimo had shown interest in the mechanics of machinery and automotive engines: a passion that remained even when he took political and social positions of prominence.

He was the seventeenth child of pharmacist Jerônimo Ribeiro Rosado, and his second wife, Isaura Rosado Maia. Dix-sept means "seventeen" in French, since his father had the eccentric custom of numbering their children with French numbers. He was the older brother of Jerônimo Dix-Huit Rosado, also a mayor of Mossoró.

Soon after his father's death, he became the leader of the family, commanding and expanding the gypsum business for 18 years. As a result, the gypsum business grows, a road and fluvial transport company is opened, the mining Jerônimo Rosado open national borders, Mossoró Comercial e Navegação Ltda. diversifies its activities: insurance, aviation, air cargo, salt transport.

Political career 

Rosado came to municipal power on March 31, 1948, winning his opponent Sebastião Fernandes with 4,428 votes against 2,992 Fernandes.

As mayor of Mossoró, Rosado had his administration developed upon assumptions used in their management activities - the successful man - as he was considered at the time, and even today in many business condition of the private sector, as Rosado always set his government in the city with great performance, coming soon after the state government.

He was elected governor of Rio Grande do Norte in 1950, having got majority of over 33,242 votes on Manoel Varela.

Rosado died in a plane crash on a flight coming out of Parnamirim to Rio de Janeiro, less than a year after becoming governor. This generated commotion in the state. He was buried in Alecrim Cemetery in Natal.

References

1911 births
1951 deaths
Governors of Rio Grande do Norte
People from Mossoró
Victims of aviation accidents or incidents in Brazil